Chandra Mohan Sinha (born 20 June 1958- 13 May 2002) is an Indian politician. He was a member of the Rajya Sabha, the upper house of the Parliament of India as a member of the Janata Dal. He was elected to the Lok Sabha, the lower house of the Parliament of India as a member of the Janata Party .

References

External links
Official biographical sketch in Parliament of India website

1923 births
Lok Sabha members from Odisha
Rajya Sabha members from Odisha
India MPs 1971–1977
India MPs 1977–1979
2002 deaths
Janata Dal politicians
Janata Party politicians